Charles C. Platt Homestead is a historic home located at Plattsburgh in Clinton County, New York.  It was built about 1802 and is a two-story, rectangular plan dwelling on a stone foundation in the Federal style.  It features a one-story, gable roof rear wing with a board and batten wing behind.  In 1814, it was used as the headquarters for Major-General Sir Thomas Macdougall Brisbane during the Battle of Plattsburgh.

It was listed on the National Register of Historic Places in 1982.

References

Houses on the National Register of Historic Places in New York (state)
Federal architecture in New York (state)
1800s architecture in the United States
Houses in Clinton County, New York
Houses completed in the 19th century
National Register of Historic Places in Clinton County, New York